Donald Eugene DeVoe (born December 31, 1941) is a former American college basketball coach and former player.  DeVoe played college basketball for Ohio State University, and later served as the head coach for Virginia Tech, the University of Wyoming, the University of Tennessee, the University of Florida and the United States Naval Academy.

Early life and playing career 
Born in Sabina, Ohio, DeVoe grew up in the small town of Port William, Ohio.  He attended Ohio State University in Columbus, Ohio, where he played for coach Fred Taylor's Ohio State Buckeyes from 1962 to 1964.  He was a member of the 1962 Buckeyes team that lost to the Cincinnati Bearcats in the final game of the NCAA Tournament, as well as the Buckeyes' Big Ten Conference champion teams of 1963 and 1964.

Coaching career 

DeVoe's Buckeyes teammates included Bob Knight, under whom he served as an assistant coach, from 1965 to 1970, while Knight led the Army Black Knights men's basketball team.  At that time, DeVoe served as a graduate assistant at Ohio State University for the 1970–71 season. After a season with Ohio State, DeVoe became the head coach for Virginia Tech.

While coaching the Virginia Tech Hokies men's basketball team, DeVoe led the Hokies to a National Invitational Tournament (NIT) title in 1973,  as well as an NCAA tournament appearance in 1976.  Playing an independent schedule, DeVoe's Hokies compiled an 88–45 record in five seasons from 1971 to 1976.  From 1976 to 1978, DeVoe led the Wyoming Cowboys basketball program.

From 1978 to 1989, DeVoe was the head coach of the Tennessee Volunteers men's basketball team.  In eleven seasons in Knoxville, he compiled a 204–137 record.  DeVoe's Volunteers teams emphasized hustle, team play and man-to-man defense.  He led the Volunteers to their first ever NCAA Tournament Sweet Sixteen appearance in 1981, where they lost to top-seeded Virginia Cavaliers.  In his final season at Tennessee in 1988–89, he led the Vols to a 19–11 record and an NCAA Tournament appearance.

In the aftermath of NCAA infractions that led the University of Florida to demand head coach Norm Sloan's resignation before the start of the 1989–90 season, DeVoe became the interim head coach of the Florida Gators men's basketball team shortly after retiring as head coach of Tennessee.  The Gators were a talented team beset by personality problems, and DeVoe later described his acceptance of the job on an interim basis as a "mistake" that left him without authority to fix the program's more serious issues.  He publicly clashed with the Gators' temperamental star center Dwayne Schintzius when DeVoe attempted to impose a new conditioning program and a measure of team discipline.  Schintzius quit mid-season, ostensibly over DeVoe's demand that he get a haircut, and the Gators finished 7–21 overall and 3–15 in the SEC.  After he was let go by Florida, he was succeeded by Lon Kruger.

DeVoe served as the head coach of the Navy Midshipmen men's basketball team from 1992 to 2004.  He led the Midshipmen to a 182–155 record, a 26–3 record against arch-rival Army, five Patriot League regular season titles, three Patriot League tournament titles, and three NCAA Tournament appearances in twelve seasons.  DeVoe was named Patriot League Coach of the Year three times.

In his thirty-one season career as a college basketball head coach, DeVoe led three different teams to the NCAA tournament, and posted an overall win–loss record of 512–389 (.568).

Personal 

DeVoe and his wife Ana have three children: Donna Lee, Elliott and AnaLise. He is currently a member of the NIT selection committee.

Head coaching record

References

Bibliography 

 Dortch, Chris,  String Music: Inside the Rise of SEC Basketball, Brassey's, Inc., Dulles, Virginia (2002).  .
 Koss, Bill, Pond Birds: Gator Basketball, The Whole Story From The Inside, Fast Break Press, Gainesville, Florida (1996).  .

1941 births
Living people
American men's basketball coaches
Army Black Knights men's basketball coaches
Basketball players from Ohio
Florida Gators men's basketball coaches
Navy Midshipmen men's basketball coaches
Ohio State Buckeyes men's basketball players
People from Clinton County, Ohio
Place of birth missing (living people)
Tennessee Volunteers basketball coaches
Virginia Tech Hokies men's basketball coaches
Wyoming Cowboys basketball coaches
People from Sabina, Ohio
Basketball coaches from Ohio
American men's basketball players